This is a list of English football transfers for the 2006–07 season. Only moves from the Premiership and Championship, as well as any other prominent moves from the lower leagues are listed.

The winter transfer window opened on 1 January 2006, with a few transfers taking place prior to that date. Players without a club may join one, either during or in between transfer windows. Clubs below Premiership level may also sign players on loan at any time. If need be, clubs may sign a goalkeeper on an emergency loan, if all others are unavailable.

Post-window signings

January transfer window

Post-window deals

See also
List of English football transfers Summer 2007

Notes

References

External links
Transfers – January 2007 BBC Sport. Retrieved 3 January 2007

2006–07 in English football
Winter 2006-07
English